"Hella Hoes" is a song by American rappers ASAP Rocky, ASAP Ferg, ASAP Nast and ASAP Twelvyy from the New York-based hip hop collective ASAP Mob. It was released as a single on June 6, 2014. The official remix features additional verses by fellow American rappers Danny Brown and Aston Mathews. Brown was supposed to be on the original version but was cut, causing him and the ASAP Mob to have a falling out.

Music video 
A music video for the song released on July 10, 2014.

Charts

Certifications

References 

2014 singles
2014 songs
ASAP Mob songs
ASAP Rocky songs
ASAP Ferg songs
Songs written by ASAP Rocky
Songs written by ASAP Ferg
RCA Records singles